Coleophora alphitonella is a moth of the family Coleophoridae that can be found in Algeria and Tunisia.

References

External links

alphitonella
Moths of Africa
Moths described in 1957